Antimony is a chemical element with the symbol Sb (from ) and atomic number 51. A lustrous gray metalloid, it is found in nature mainly as the sulfide mineral stibnite (Sb2S3). Antimony compounds have been known since ancient times and were powdered for use as medicine and cosmetics, often known by the Arabic name kohl. The earliest known description of the metal in the West was written in 1540 by Vannoccio Biringuccio.

China is the largest producer of antimony and its compounds, with most production coming from the Xikuangshan Mine in Hunan. The industrial methods for refining antimony from stibnite are roasting followed by reduction with carbon, or direct reduction of stibnite with iron.

The largest applications for metallic antimony are in alloys with lead and tin, which have improved properties for solders, bullets, and plain bearings. It improves the rigidity of lead-alloy plates in lead–acid batteries. Antimony trioxide is a prominent additive for halogen-containing flame retardants. Antimony is used as a dopant in semiconductor devices.

Characteristics

Properties

Antimony is a member of group 15 of the periodic table, one of the elements called pnictogens, and has an electronegativity of 2.05. In accordance with periodic trends, it is more electronegative than tin or bismuth, and less electronegative than tellurium or arsenic. Antimony is stable in air at room temperature, but reacts with oxygen if heated to produce antimony trioxide, Sb2O3.

Antimony is a silvery, lustrous gray metalloid with a Mohs scale hardness of 3, which is too soft to mark hard objects. Coins of antimony were issued in China's Guizhou province in 1931; durability was poor, and minting was soon discontinued. Antimony is resistant to attack by acids.

Four allotropes of antimony are known: a stable metallic form, and three metastable forms (explosive, black, and yellow). Elemental antimony is a brittle, silver-white, shiny metalloid. When slowly cooled, molten antimony crystallizes into a trigonal cell, isomorphic with the gray allotrope of arsenic. A rare explosive form of antimony can be formed from the electrolysis of antimony trichloride. When scratched with a sharp implement, an exothermic reaction occurs and white fumes are given off as metallic antimony forms; when rubbed with a pestle in a mortar, a strong detonation occurs. Black antimony is formed upon rapid cooling of antimony vapor. It has the same crystal structure as red phosphorus and black arsenic; it oxidizes in air and may ignite spontaneously. At 100 °C, it gradually transforms into the stable form. The yellow allotrope of antimony is the most unstable; it has been generated only by oxidation of stibine (SbH3) at −90 °C. Above this temperature and in ambient light, this metastable allotrope transforms into the more stable black allotrope.

Elemental antimony adopts a layered structure (space group Rm No. 166) whose layers consist of fused, ruffled, six-membered rings. The nearest and next-nearest neighbors form an irregular octahedral complex, with the three atoms in each double layer slightly closer than the three atoms in the next. This relatively close packing leads to a high density of 6.697 g/cm3, but the weak bonding between the layers leads to the low hardness and brittleness of antimony.

Isotopes

Antimony has two stable isotopes: 121Sb with a natural abundance of 57.36% and 123Sb with a natural abundance of 42.64%. It also has 35 radioisotopes, of which the longest-lived is 125Sb with a half-life of 2.75 years. In addition, 29 metastable states have been characterized. The most stable of these is 120m1Sb with a half-life of 5.76 days. Isotopes that are lighter than the stable 123Sb tend to decay by β+ decay, and those that are heavier tend to decay by β− decay, with some exceptions.

Occurrence

The abundance of antimony in the Earth's crust is estimated at 0.2 parts per million, comparable to thallium at 0.5 parts per million and silver at 0.07 ppm. Even though this element is not abundant, it is found in more than 100 mineral species. Antimony is sometimes found natively (e.g. on Antimony Peak), but more frequently it is found in the sulfide stibnite (Sb2S3) which is the predominant ore mineral.

Compounds

Antimony compounds are often classified according to their oxidation state: Sb(III) and Sb(V). The +5 oxidation state is more common.

Oxides and hydroxides
Antimony trioxide is formed when antimony is burnt in air. Antimony pentoxide can be formed only by oxidation with concentrated nitric acid. Antimony also forms a mixed-valence oxide, antimony tetroxide, which features both Sb(III) and Sb(V). Unlike oxides of phosphorus and arsenic, these oxides are amphoteric, do not form well-defined oxoacids, and react with acids to form antimony salts.

Transition metal antimonites are also known. Antimonic acid exists only as the hydrate , forming salts as the antimonate anion . When a solution containing this anion is dehydrated, the precipitate contains mixed oxides.

The most important antimony ore is stibnite. Other sulfide minerals include pyrargyrite, zinkenite, jamesonite, and boulangerite. Antimony pentasulfide is non-stoichiometric, which features antimony in the +3 oxidation state and S–S bonds.

Halides

 + 6 HF → 2  + 3 

Molten  is a weak electrical conductor. The trichloride  is prepared by dissolving  in hydrochloric acid:
 + 6 HCl → 2  + 3 
Arsenic sulfides are not readily attacked by the hydrochloric acid, so this method offers a route to As-free Sb.

The pentahalides  and  have trigonal bipyramidal molecular geometry in the gas phase, but in the liquid phase,  is polymeric, whereas  is monomeric.  is a powerful Lewis acid used to make the superacid fluoroantimonic acid ("H2SbF7").

Oxyhalides are more common for antimony than for arsenic and phosphorus.

Antimonides, hydrides, and organoantimony compounds
Compounds in this class generally are described as derivatives of Sb3−. Antimony forms antimonides with metals, such as indium antimonide (InSb) and silver antimonide. The alkali metal and zinc antimonides, such as Na3Sb and Zn3Sb2, are more reactive. Treating these antimonides with acid produces the highly unstable gas stibine, :
 + 3  → 
Stibine can also be produced by treating  salts with hydride reagents such as sodium borohydride. Stibine decomposes spontaneously at room temperature. Because stibine has a positive heat of formation, it is thermodynamically unstable and thus antimony does not react with hydrogen directly.

Organoantimony compounds are typically prepared by alkylation of antimony halides with Grignard reagents. A large variety of compounds are known with both Sb(III) and Sb(V) centers, including mixed chloro-organic derivatives, anions, and cations. Examples include triphenylstibine (Sb(C6H5)3) and pentaphenylantimony (Sb(C6H5)5).

History

Antimony(III) sulfide, Sb2S3, was recognized in predynastic Egypt as an eye cosmetic (kohl) as early as about 3100 BC, when the cosmetic palette was invented.

An artifact, said to be part of a vase, made of antimony dating to about 3000 BC was found at Telloh, Chaldea (part of present-day Iraq), and a copper object plated with antimony dating between 2500 BC and 2200 BC has been found in Egypt. Austen, at a lecture by Herbert Gladstone in 1892, commented that "we only know of antimony at the present day as a highly brittle and crystalline metal, which could hardly be fashioned into a useful vase, and therefore this remarkable 'find' (artifact mentioned above) must represent the lost art of rendering antimony malleable."

The British archaeologist Roger Moorey was unconvinced the artifact was indeed a vase, mentioning that Selimkhanov, after his analysis of the Tello object (published in 1975), "attempted to relate the metal to Transcaucasian natural antimony" (i.e. native metal) and that "the antimony objects from Transcaucasia are all small personal ornaments." This weakens the evidence for a lost art "of rendering antimony malleable."

The Roman scholar Pliny the Elder described several ways of preparing antimony sulfide for medical purposes in his treatise Natural History, around 77 AD. Pliny the Elder also made a distinction between "male" and "female" forms of antimony; the male form is probably the sulfide, while the female form, which is superior, heavier, and less friable, has been suspected to be native metallic antimony.

The Greek naturalist Pedanius Dioscorides mentioned that antimony sulfide could be roasted by heating by a current of air. It is thought that this produced metallic antimony.

Antimony was frequently described in alchemical manuscripts, including the Summa Perfectionis of Pseudo-Geber, written around the 14th century. A description of a procedure for isolating antimony is later given in the 1540 book De la pirotechnia by Vannoccio Biringuccio, predating the more famous 1556 book by Agricola, De re metallica. In this context Agricola has been often incorrectly credited with the discovery of metallic antimony. The book Currus Triumphalis Antimonii (The Triumphal Chariot of Antimony), describing the preparation of metallic antimony, was published in Germany in 1604. It was purported to be written by a Benedictine monk, writing under the name Basilius Valentinus in the 15th century; if it were authentic, which it is not, it would predate Biringuccio.

The metal antimony was known to German chemist Andreas Libavius in 1615 who obtained it by adding iron to a molten mixture of antimony sulfide, salt and potassium tartrate. This procedure produced antimony with a crystalline or starred surface.

With the advent of challenges to phlogiston theory, it was recognized that antimony is an element forming sulfides, oxides, and other compounds, as do other metals.

The first discovery of naturally occurring pure antimony in the Earth's crust was described by the Swedish scientist and local mine district engineer Anton von Swab in 1783; the type-sample was collected from the Sala Silver Mine in the Bergslagen mining district of Sala, Västmanland, Sweden.

Etymology
The medieval Latin form, from which the modern languages and late Byzantine Greek take their names for antimony, is antimonium. The origin of this is uncertain; all suggestions have some difficulty either of form or interpretation. The popular etymology, from ἀντίμοναχός anti-monachos or French antimoine, still has adherents; this would mean "monk-killer", and is explained by many early alchemists being monks, and antimony being poisonous. However, the low toxicity of antimony (see below) makes this unlikely.

Another popular etymology is the hypothetical Greek word ἀντίμόνος antimonos, "against aloneness", explained as "not found as metal", or "not found unalloyed". Edmund Oscar von Lippmann conjectured a hypothetical Greek word ανθήμόνιον anthemonion, which would mean "floret", and cites several examples of related Greek words (but not that one) which describe chemical or biological efflorescence.

The early uses of antimonium include the translations, in 1050–1100, by Constantine the African of Arabic medical treatises. Several authorities believe antimonium is a scribal corruption of some Arabic form; Meyerhof derives it from ithmid; other possibilities include athimar, the Arabic name of the metalloid, and a hypothetical as-stimmi, derived from or parallel to the Greek.

The standard chemical symbol for antimony (Sb) is credited to Jöns Jakob Berzelius, who derived the abbreviation from stibium.

The ancient words for antimony mostly have, as their chief meaning, kohl, the sulfide of antimony.
The Egyptians called antimony mśdmt or stm.

The Arabic word for the substance, as opposed to the cosmetic, can appear as إثمد ithmid, athmoud, othmod, or uthmod. Littré suggests the first form, which is the earliest, derives from stimmida, an accusative for stimmi. The Greek word, στίμμι (stimmi) is used by Attic tragic poets of the 5th century BC, and is possibly a loan word from Arabic or from Egyptian stm.

Production

Process
The extraction of antimony from ores depends on the quality and composition of the ore. Most antimony is mined as the sulfide; lower-grade ores are concentrated by froth flotation, while higher-grade ores are heated to 500–600 °C, the temperature at which stibnite melts and separates from the gangue minerals. Antimony can be isolated from the crude antimony sulfide by reduction with scrap iron:

 + 3 Fe → 2 Sb + 3 FeS

The sulfide is converted to an oxide by roasting.  The product is further purified by vaporizing the volatile antimony(III) oxide, which is recovered. This sublimate is often used directly for the main applications, impurities being arsenic and sulfide. Antimony is isolated from the oxide by a carbothermal reduction:

2  + 3 C → 4 Sb + 3 

The lower-grade ores are reduced in blast furnaces while the higher-grade ores are reduced in reverberatory furnaces.

Top producers and production volumes
In 2022, according to the US Geological Survey, China accounted for 54.5% of total antimony production, followed in second place by Russia with 18.2% and Tajikistan with 15.5%.

Chinese production of antimony is expected to decline in the future as mines and smelters are closed down by the government as part of pollution control. Especially due to an environmental protection law having gone into effect in January 2015 and revised "Emission Standards of Pollutants for Stanum, Antimony, and Mercury" having gone into effect, hurdles for economic production are higher.

Reported production of antimony in China has fallen and is unlikely to increase in the coming years, according to the Roskill report. No significant antimony deposits in China have been developed for about ten years, and the remaining economic reserves are being rapidly depleted.

Reserves

Supply risk
For antimony-importing regions such as Europe and the U.S., antimony is considered to be a critical mineral for industrial manufacturing that is at risk of supply chain disruption. With  global  production coming mainly from China (74%), Tajikistan (8%), and Russia (4%), these sources are critical to supply.
European Union: Antimony is considered a critical raw material for defense, automotive, construction and textiles. The E.U. sources are 100% imported, coming mainly from Turkey (62%), Bolivia (20%) and Guatemala (7%).
United Kingdom: The British Geological Survey's 2015 risk list ranks antimony second highest (after rare earth elements) on the relative supply risk index.
United States: Antimony is a mineral commodity considered critical to the economic and national security. In 2022, no antimony was mined in the U.S.

Applications
Approximately 48% of antimony is consumed in flame retardants, 33% in lead–acid batteries, and 8% in plastics.

Flame retardants 

Antimony is mainly used as the trioxide for flame-proofing compounds, always in combination with halogenated flame retardants except in halogen-containing polymers. The flame retarding effect of antimony trioxide is produced by the formation of halogenated antimony compounds, which react with hydrogen atoms, and probably also with oxygen atoms and OH radicals, thus inhibiting fire. Markets for these flame-retardants include children's clothing, toys, aircraft, and automobile seat covers. They are also added to polyester resins in fiberglass composites for such items as light aircraft engine covers. The resin will burn in the presence of an externally generated flame, but will extinguish when the external flame is removed.

Alloys 

Antimony forms a highly useful alloy with lead, increasing its hardness and mechanical strength. For most applications involving lead, varying amounts of antimony are used as alloying metal. In lead–acid batteries, this addition improves plate strength and charging characteristics. For sailboats, lead keels are used to provide righting moment, ranging from 600 lbs to over 200 tons for the largest sailing superyachts; to improve hardness and tensile strength of the lead keel, antimony is mixed with lead between 2% and 5% by volume. Antimony is used in antifriction alloys (such as Babbitt metal), in bullets and lead shot, electrical cable sheathing, type metal (for example, for linotype printing machines), solder (some "lead-free" solders contain 5% Sb), in pewter, and in hardening alloys with low tin content in the manufacturing of organ pipes.

Other applications 

Three other applications consume nearly all the rest of the world's supply. One application is as a stabilizer and catalyst for the production of polyethylene terephthalate. Another is as a fining agent to remove microscopic bubbles in glass, mostly for TV screens  antimony ions interact with oxygen, suppressing the tendency of the latter to form bubbles. The third application is pigments.

In the 1990s antimony was increasingly being used in semiconductors as a dopant in n-type silicon wafers for diodes, infrared detectors, and Hall-effect devices. In the 1950s, the emitters and collectors of n-p-n alloy junction transistors were doped with tiny beads of a lead-antimony alloy. Indium antimonide (InSb) is used as a material for mid-infrared detectors.

Biology and medicine have few uses for antimony. Treatments containing antimony, known as antimonials, are used as emetics. Antimony compounds are used as antiprotozoan drugs. Potassium antimonyl tartrate, or tartar emetic, was once used as an anti-schistosomal drug from 1919 on. It was subsequently replaced by praziquantel. Antimony and its compounds are used in several veterinary preparations, such as anthiomaline and lithium antimony thiomalate, as a skin conditioner in ruminants. Antimony has a nourishing or conditioning effect on keratinized tissues in animals.

Antimony-based drugs, such as meglumine antimoniate, are also considered the drugs of choice for treatment of leishmaniasis in domestic animals. Besides having low therapeutic indices, the drugs have minimal penetration of the bone marrow, where some of the Leishmania amastigotes reside, and curing the disease – especially the visceral form – is very difficult. Elemental antimony as an antimony pill was once used as a medicine. It could be reused by others after ingestion and elimination.

Antimony(III) sulfide is used in the heads of some safety matches. Antimony sulfides help to stabilize the friction coefficient in automotive brake pad materials. Antimony is used in bullets, bullet tracers, paint, glass art, and as an opacifier in enamel. Antimony-124 is used together with beryllium in neutron sources; the gamma rays emitted by antimony-124 initiate the photodisintegration of beryllium. The emitted neutrons have an average energy of 24 keV. Natural antimony is used in startup neutron sources.

Historically, the powder derived from crushed antimony (kohl) has been applied to the eyes with a metal rod and with one's spittle, thought by the ancients to aid in curing eye infections. The practice is still seen in Yemen and in other Muslim countries.

Precautions 

Antimony and many of its compounds are toxic, and the effects of antimony poisoning are similar to arsenic poisoning. The toxicity of antimony is far lower than that of arsenic; this might be caused by the significant differences of uptake, metabolism and excretion between arsenic and antimony. The uptake of antimony(III) or antimony(V) in the gastrointestinal tract is at most 20%. Antimony(V) is not quantitatively reduced to antimony(III) in the cell (in fact antimony(III) is oxidised to antimony(V) instead).

Since methylation of antimony does not occur, the excretion of antimony(V) in urine is the main way of elimination. Like arsenic, the most serious effect of acute antimony poisoning is cardiotoxicity and the resulted myocarditis, however it can also manifest as Adams–Stokes syndrome which arsenic doesn't. Reported cases of intoxication by antimony equivalent to 90 mg antimony potassium tartrate dissolved from enamel has been reported to show only short term effects. An intoxication with 6 g of antimony potassium tartrate was reported to result in death after 3 days.

Inhalation of antimony dust is harmful and in certain cases may be fatal; in small doses, antimony causes headaches, dizziness, and depression. Larger doses such as prolonged skin contact may cause dermatitis, or damage the kidneys and the liver, causing violent and frequent vomiting, leading to death in a few days.

Antimony is incompatible with strong oxidizing agents, strong acids, halogen acids, chlorine, or fluorine. It should be kept away from heat.

Antimony leaches from polyethylene terephthalate (PET) bottles into liquids. While levels observed for bottled water are below drinking water guidelines, fruit juice concentrates (for which no guidelines are established) produced in the UK were found to contain up to 44.7 µg/L of antimony, well above the EU limits for tap water of 5 µg/L. The guidelines are:
 World Health Organization: 20 µg/L
 Japan: 15 µg/L
 United States Environmental Protection Agency, Health Canada and the Ontario Ministry of Environment: 6 µg/L
 EU and German Federal Ministry of Environment: 5 µg/L

The tolerable daily intake (TDI) proposed by WHO is 6 µg antimony per kilogram of body weight. The immediately dangerous to life or health (IDLH) value for antimony is 50 mg/m3.

Toxicity 

Certain compounds of antimony appear to be toxic, particularly antimony trioxide and antimony potassium tartrate. Effects may be similar to arsenic poisoning. Occupational exposure may cause respiratory irritation, pneumoconiosis, antimony spots on the skin, gastrointestinal symptoms, and cardiac arrhythmias. In addition, antimony trioxide is potentially carcinogenic to humans.

Adverse health effects have been observed in humans and animals following inhalation, oral, or dermal exposure to antimony and antimony compounds. Antimony toxicity typically occurs either due to occupational exposure, during therapy or from accidental ingestion. It is unclear if antimony can enter the body through the skin. The presence of low levels of antimony in saliva may also be associated with dental decay.

See also 

 Phase change memory

Notes

References

Cited sources

External links

 Public Health Statement for Antimony
 International Antimony Association vzw (i2a)
 Chemistry in its element podcast (MP3) from the Royal Society of Chemistry's Chemistry World: Antimony
 Antimony at The Periodic Table of Videos (University of Nottingham)
 CDC – NIOSH Pocket Guide to Chemical Hazards – Antimony
 Antimony Mineral data and specimen images

 
Chemical elements
Metalloids
Native element minerals
Nuclear materials
Pnictogens
Trigonal minerals
Minerals in space group 166
Materials that expand upon freezing
Chemical elements with rhombohedral structure